Elena Kong May Yee (born 20 September 1971) is a Hong Kong actress, radio DJ, and television host.

Career
Elena Kong started off her career in the entertainment industry as a model after being scouted and appeared in many television commercials during the 1990s. She also starred in some of Andy Lau's music videos. After joining Asia Television (ATV) in 1997, she landed her first lead role in television drama Forrest Cat. She left ATV in 2008. In 2009, Elena joined Television Broadcasts Limited (TVB). Her performance as Angela Auntie in Beauty Knows No Pain (2010) was well-received, which helped her earn a nomination for the Best Supporting Actress award at the 2010 TVB Anniversary Awards, where she placed among the top 5 nominations. Her performance as Yvonne Yik in Silver Spoon, Sterling Shackles (2012) gained her more popularity and recognition, garnering her third nomination Best Supporting Actress award at the 2012 TVB Anniversary Awards. At the 2013 TVB Anniversary Awards, she won the Best Supporting Actress award for her role as Heather Fong in the critical acclaimed Triumph in the Skies II (2013). At the 2022 TVB Anniversary Awards, she won the Best Actress with her role in the family drama Get On A Flat.

Kong was formerly a radio DJ at Digital Broadcasting Corporation Hong Kong Limited (DBC).

Personal life
Elena studied Business Administration at the Chu Hai College of Higher Education.

Filmography

Film

Television dramas

References

External links 
 
Elena Kong at Sina Weibo
Elena Kong's Yahoo! BLOG

1971 births
Living people
Hong Kong film actresses
Hong Kong television presenters
Hong Kong women television presenters
Hong Kong television actresses
Hong Kong female models
TVB veteran actors
20th-century Hong Kong actresses
21st-century Hong Kong actresses